is a passenger railway station in located in the city of Tsu,  Mie Prefecture, Japan, operated by the private railway operator Kintetsu Railway.

Lines
Hisai Station is served by the Nagoya Line, and is located 74.0 rail kilometers from the starting point of the line at Kintetsu Nagoya Station.

Station layout
The station was consists of two opposed side platforms , connected by a footbridge.

Platforms

Adjacent stations 
Passengers to Osaka must change trains at Ise-Nakagawa Station (also at Tsuruhashi for Kobe) as no through trains to and from Osaka stop at this station.Local and express stop, and some Limited express stop in the morning and at night. The train connecting the Nagoya and Ise departing from 6 o'clock to 9:00. And the train connecting Nagoya and Ise departing from Kintetsu Nagoya Station stops after 6pm.

History
Hisai Station opened on November 10, 1908 as a station on the Dai Nippon Kido's Ise Line, which was renamed the Chusei Railway in 1920. The Sangu Express Electric Railway's Tsu Line connected to the station on May 18, 1930. The Tsu Line was renamed the Nagoya Line on December 7, 1938. On March 15, 1941, the Sangu Express Electric Railway merged with Osaka Electric Railway to become a station on Kansai Express Railway's Nagoya Line. This line in turn was merged with the Nankai Electric Railway on June 1, 1944 to form Kintetsu. The Chusei Railway went out of business on December 1, 1942. The station was rebuilt in November 1997.

Passenger statistics
In fiscal 2019, the station was used by an average of 5598 passengers daily (boarding passengers only).

Surrounding area
JGSDF Hisai Base
Hisaishinmachi Post Office
Mie Prefectural Hisai High School
Mie Prefectural Hisai Norin High School

See also
List of railway stations in Japan

References

External links

 Kintetsu: Hisai Station

Railway stations in Japan opened in 1908
Railway stations in Mie Prefecture
Stations of Kintetsu Railway
Tsu, Mie